Above the Rim – The Soundtrack is the official soundtrack to the 1994 film of the same name. The soundtrack, released by Death Row and Interscope Records on March 22, 1994, was executive produced by Suge Knight. Dr. Dre acted as supervising producer on the project.

Six tapes were released for the soundtrack's promotion. The album was able to garner critical praise and obtain commercial success, a feat not easily accomplished for soundtracks in general, and hip hop-based soundtracks in particular. The album shipped over two million copies and won the Soundtrack of the Year award at the 1995 Source Awards. The cassette version of the soundtrack contained three bonus tracks that could not fit on the CD due to time constraints: "Pain" by 2Pac (with Stretch), "Mi Monie Rite!" by Lord G, and "Loyal to the Game" by 2Pac, Treach from Naughty By Nature, and Riddler. The bonus track, "Pain" was initially rejected for use in the film by Dr. Dre. However, at the request of recording engineer Norman Whitfield Jr., the track was recut and remixed for the film by record producer, Isaias Gamboa. Under Death Row, Above the Rim soundtrack was the third album under the label to reach number-one on the R&B Albums chart where it stayed for ten nonconsecutive weeks (Heavy D & the Boyz's Nuttin' But Love interrupted that streak for one week), while it went to second place on the Billboard 200 chart. Track 13 is a sensual remake of Rev. Al Green's classic "I'm Still In Love With You" by R&B recording artist Al B. Sure!

Track listing

Bonus material

Charts

Weekly charts

Year-end charts

Singles

Certifications

Personnel
Information taken from Allmusic.
 Engineers: Dat Nigga Daz, Tommy D. Daugherty, Greg Geitzenauer, Rob Paustian
 Executive in Charge of Music: Toby Emmerich
 Executive Producers: Suge Knight, Kenny Ortíz
 Mixers: Courtney Branch, Craig Burbidge, Rob Chiarelli, Dat Nigga Daz, DJ Quik, Dr. Dre, Greg Geitzenauer, Tracy Kendrick, Nikke Nikole, Chris Puran, Norman Whitfield Jr.
 Mixing Engineers: Craig Burbidge, Rob Chiarelli
 Music Supervisor: Anita Camarata
 Performers: 2nd II None, 2Pac, Big Pimpin' Delemond, Boss Hog, CPO, DJ Rogers, Nate Dogg, Warren G, H-Town, Aaron Hall, Jewell, Lady of Rage, Nanci Fletcher, O.F.T.B., Paradise, Al B. Sure!, Sweet Sable, SWV, Macadoshis
 Producers: 2nd II None, Suamana Swoop Brown, Dat Nigga Daz, Dalvin DeGrate, DJ Quik, Dr. Dre, Warren G, Johnny "J", Tracy Kendrick, Benny Medina, Brian Alexander Morgan, Nikke Nikole, O.F.T.B., Darryl Pearson, Chris Puran, Sharon Riley, Carl "Butch" Small, Al B. Sure!, DeVante Swing
 Production Coordinators: Mary (Alm) Kusnier, Kim Brown, Madelyne Woods
 Remixers: Def Jef, Arty Skye, Meech Wells, Isaias Gamboa (music producer)
 Supervising Producer: Dr. Dre
 Vocals: Allen Gordon Jr., Snoop Doggy Dogg

See also

 List of number-one R&B albums of 1994 (U.S.)

References

External links
 

Sports film soundtracks
Hip hop soundtracks
Albums produced by Dr. Dre
Albums produced by DJ Quik
Albums produced by Warren G
G-funk soundtracks
1994 soundtrack albums
Death Row Records soundtracks
Interscope Records soundtracks
Albums produced by Johnny "J"
Gangsta rap soundtracks
West Coast hip hop soundtracks